Pauline Lafont (6 April 196311 August 1988) was a French actress. She was the daughter of film star Bernadette Lafont and Diourka Medveczky, a Hungarian sculptor.

Born Pauline Aïda Simone Medveczky in Nîmes, France, she died in a hiking accident in Barre-des-Cévennes, Lozère, France. Three months and ten days after she had set out, her body was found by a passing farmer at the foot of a cliff, four kilometres from her home. Investigators determined she had fallen more than ten metres and died instantly. Prior to the discovery of her body, her disappearance had triggered several rumours regarding her whereabouts.

Filmography

Film
1976: Vincent mit l'âne dans un pré (et s'en vint dans l'autre) (directed by Pierre Zucca) - Une petite fille
1983: Les Planqués du régiment (directed by Michel Caputo) - Christiane, l'infirmière
1983: Papy fait de la résistance (directed by Jean-Marie Poiré) - Colette Bourdelle
1983: Balade sanglante (Short, directed by Sylvain Madigan)
1983: Vive les femmes ! (directed by Claude Confortes) - Pauline
1984: The Bay Boy (directed by Daniel Petrie) - Janine Chaisson
1985: L'amour braque (directed by Andrzej Żuławski) - Martine (uncredited)
1985: Poulet au vinaigre (directed by Claude Chabrol) - Henriette
1985: Le pactole (directed by Jean-Pierre Mocky) - Anne Beaulieu
1986: La galette du roi (directed by Jean-Michel Ribes) - Maria-Helena de Castigliani
1986: I Hate Actors (directed by Gérard Krawczyk) - Elvina
1987: Sale temps (Short, directed by Alain Pigeaux) - Rachel
1987: L'été en pente douce (directed by Gérard Krawczyk) - Lilas
1987: Keep Up Your Right (directed by Jean-Luc Godard) - La golfeuse
1987: Sale destin (Short, directed by Sylvain Madigan) - (voice)
1987: Jing du qiu xia (directed by Hong Xie)
1988: Deux minutes de soleil en plus (directed by Gérard Vergez) - Cat

Television
1984: Dernier banco (TV Movie) - Madeleine
1984: Un chien écrasé - Manu
1986: Le petit docteur - Anna
1988: Coup de pouce - Caroline (final appearance)

References

External links

French film actresses
People from Nîmes
Mountaineering deaths
Sport deaths in France
1963 births
1988 deaths
20th-century French actresses
French people of Hungarian descent
French television actresses